François Vaillancourt (born 1967) is a Montreal-based Canadian painter.

François Vaillancourt has a formal training in fine arts and graphic design. After 15 years working as an art director in various advertising agencies, he started painting again. His work plays upon the contrast between very fluid backgrounds and central images which are hyper-realistic using a technique that deliberately mixes raw and refined. Each painting bears witness to the fact that time leaves its mark on objects with patina and deformity indelibly defining an ephemeral moment. His approach cannot be defined or confined by material. Instead it has been chosen solely as the best means to a beautiful end. 
His work, mostly acrylic and ink on canvas, has been featured on book covers and was the subject of two shows, one in Montreal and the other in Quebec city.

External links
Interview with François Vaillancourt, Incubus' Choice, January 2008

1967 births
Living people
Canadian painters